George Washington is an outdoor sculpture by Henry Kirke Brown (1814–1886), located in Union Square, Manhattan, in the United States. The bronze equestrian statue was dedicated in 1856 and is the oldest sculpture in the New York City Parks collection.

Description and history
Richard Upjohn served as architect for the pedestal / plinth. The sculpture measures 26'4" by 13'6" and sits on a Barre granite pedestal that measures 12'2" by 7'9" by 15'. It was dedicated on July 4, 1856. The monument is in axial alignment with the statue of Abraham Lincoln and the Independence Flagstaff.

See also

 List of memorials to George Washington
 List of sculptures of presidents of the United States
 List of statues of George Washington

References

External links

 A Difference in Kind: Spontaneous Memorials after 9/11 by Harriet F. Senie, International Sculpture Center
 Leon Reid IV To Give Union Square George Washington Statue A Makeover (September 30, 2011), The Huffington Post

1856 establishments in New York (state)
1856 sculptures
Sculptures by Henry Kirke Brown
Bronze sculptures in Manhattan
Equestrian statues in New York City
Monuments and memorials in Manhattan
Monuments and memorials to George Washington in the United States
Outdoor sculptures in Manhattan
Sculptures of men in New York City
Statues of George Washington
Union Square, Manhattan